Craig Wrobleski is a Canadian cinematographer, best known for his work on the television series Fargo, Legion and The Umbrella Academy.

Career
After graduating from the Broadcasting Program at Mount Royal College in Calgary, Craig Wrobleski started working as a studio cameraman at CFCN Television.  After leaving CFCN, he worked on many independent productions, often volunteering his time to learn about the world of dramatic production and build relationships.  This led to opportunities to get behind the camera for documentaries.  Craig's documentary work took him all over North America and Europe for films including Chrome Dreams (a 4-part history of the automobile), The Geometry of Love (based on the book by Margaret Visser and shot in Rome and Toronto), God's Explorers (a feature length doc about Jesuit missionaries in Northern Canada)  and Hitman Hart; Wrestling with Shadows.  Wrobleski also served as a camera operator for the cycling events at the 1994 Commonwealth Games in Victoria, BC.

Wrobleski has also worked on numerous commercials, music videos, and live concerts over the years, producing content for MTV, MuchMusic, CMT, CBC, and PBS.  He also shot Balletlujah! a dance collaboration between K.D. Lang, Joni Mitchell, and the Alberta Ballet.

As an entree into dramatic storytelling, Wrobleski shot award-winning short dramatic shorts and took on second unit photography for numerous television and feature projects including  Man in the Mirror: The Michael Jackson Story, as well as the television mini- series Human Trafficking, which took him to the Czech Republic and Thailand.

His first long-form dramatic cinematography roles were for TV movies including Northern Lights and the feature films 45 RPM and Rufus.  In 2010, he started working as cinematographer on the internationally popular Canadian television drama Heartland.  Second Unit work on the award-winning first season of the FX television series Fargo led to Wrobleski working alongside fellow cinematographer Dana Gonzales on the acclaimed second and third seasons of Fargo as well as the revolutionary FX series Legion, alternating DP duties with Dana on an episode-by-episode basis.  Craig's series work continued with the 11th season of the legendary series The X-Files, the re-boot of the groundbreaking Twilight Zone, two seasons of the hit Netflix series The Umbrella Academy and an episode of the visionary Amazon series Tales From the Loop.  In 2019, Wrobleski photographed the feature film adaptation of the Stephen King/Joe Hill short story In the Tall Grass for Netflix.

Awards
Craig's work on the "Blurryman" episode of Twilight Zone earned him an ASC Award Nomination in 2020.   The "Swedish Job" episode of The Umbrella Academy was a winner at the 2021 CSC Awards and the "Stasis" episode of Tales From the Loop was nominated. The Umbrella Academy and In the Tall Grass were both nominated for CSC Awards in 2020.   The Fargo "Who Rules the Land of Denial" episode garnered a win at the 2019 CSC Awards in addition to a CSC win in 2011 for the short film "June".  Other projects nominated for CSC Awards included the short film Synthesis and Fargo "Fear and Trembling".   Over the years, Craig has been the recipient of the Alberta Media Production Industries Association Rosie Award 16 times in various categories.

Filmography

Television
TV movies

TV series

Feature films

References

External links 

Living people
Canadian cinematographers
Mount Royal University alumni
Year of birth missing (living people)
Place of birth missing (living people)